José Maria Cárdenas López (born 2 April 1985) is a Mexican former professional footballer who played as a left-back.

Cárdenas received his first call-up to the Mexico national team in a friendly against Bolivia, scoring his first goal as well in a 5–1 victory. He was also called up to play the 2009 CONCACAF Gold Cup tournament with Mexico.

Club career

Atlante
He made his Primera División debut with Atlante on August 24, 2005 in a 2–2 draw against San Luis during the 2005 Apertura tournament. During that season, he only amassed 9 league matches, scoring no goals. During the 2006 Clausura, José María played in all 17 league matches, helping Atlante reach the play-offs. Although part of the team, Cárdenas was not able to play a part in Atlante's 2007 Apertura championship campaign, winning in the final against UNAM. His last season with the Cancún-based club was the 2008 Clausura, playing only one match. In total, Cárdenas played 70 matches for Atlante, and scored 5 goals.

Pachuca

International career
He made his debut with the senior national team on March 11, 2009 in a friendly against Bolivia and scored in his debut.

International goals

|-
| 1. || March 11, 2009 || Commerce City, Colorado, United States ||  || 5–1 || Win || Friendly
|}

International appearances
As of July 20, 2013

Honours
América
Liga MX: Clausura 2013

Morelia
Copa MX: Apertura 2013

León
Liga MX: Clausura 2014

Mexico
CONCACAF Gold Cup: 2009

References

External links
 
 
 
 

Sportspeople from Zacatecas
People from Zacatecas City
Club León footballers
Atlante F.C. footballers
C.F. Pachuca players
Santos Laguna footballers
Club América footballers
Liga MX players
Association football forwards
CONCACAF Gold Cup-winning players
2009 CONCACAF Gold Cup players
2013 CONCACAF Gold Cup players
1985 births
Living people
Atlético Morelia players
Mexican footballers
Mexico international footballers
Club Tijuana footballers
Dorados de Sinaloa footballers